Gunnison Island is located in the northwest quadrant of the Great Salt Lake in Box Elder County, Utah, United States , approximately  northwest of Salt Lake City and about  east from the lake's western shore, and is best known as an important rookery for the American white pelican (Pelecanus erythrorhynchus). The California gull (Larus californicus) also nests on the island, and occasional nesters include the great blue heron (Ardea herodias), common raven (Corvus corax), prairie falcon (Falco mexicanus), and rock wren (Salpinctes obsoltetus). 

The entire island is the Gunnison Island State Wildlife Management Area. Access to the island is restricted to prevent curious tourists from disturbing the nesting birds.

Wildlife biologists estimate that the population on Gunnison Island (about 10,000) constitutes about 10–20% of the entire American white pelican population; there are also about 15,000 California gulls that nest on the island.

Historically, the island's remote location protected it from predators, which made it an ideal spot for ground-nesting birds. However, due to recent low lake levels, it is no longer an island; it is connected to shore by a land bridge which predators can use.

The remoteness also forces the pelicans to travel  or more to find fresh water and food. The pelicans typically fly east to the Bear River Migratory Bird Refuge, where the Bear River flows into the Great Salt Lake. In the bird refuge, the water's salinity is low enough that fish can live there. (The Great Salt Lake contains no fish.)

To get to their destinations, large flocks of adult pelicans ride thermals to a great height, then coast down to their destination.

History 
Gunnison Island was named after John W. Gunnison, an American explorer and surveyor of the Great Salt Lake valley in 1849.

In the mid-1890s, artist and author Alfred Lambourne spent a year living in solitude on the island. From November 1895 to March 1896, he was alone. In March, a few enterprising individuals decided to harvest and sell the abundant guano that the nesting birds left behind as fertilizer. Lambourne included musings about these guano sifters in his work Our Inland Sea, which he authored during his time on the island. Lambourne left the island early in the winter of 1896 along with the first group of guano sifters.

The mining activity caused the pelicans to temporarily abandon Gunnison Island as a nesting site, though the gulls remained despite the human company. Because of the difficulty of obtaining the guano, however, and its tendency to dissolve in the rain and wash back into the Great Salt Lake, the guano industry was abandoned about ten years after it began.

See also 

 Carrington Island
 Fremont Island
 Promontory Mountains

References

External links

 Guano Sifters on Gunnison Island (on official Utah History to Go website)

Landforms of Box Elder County, Utah
Lake islands of Utah
Great Salt Lake
Protected areas of Box Elder County, Utah
Uninhabited islands of Utah
Islands of Utah